is a former Japanese football player.

Playing career
Urata was born in Saitama Prefecture on June 27, 1974. After graduating from Kokushikan University, he joined Japan Football League club Kawasaki Frontale in 1997. He played many matches as substitute forward the club was promoted to new league J2 League from 1999. In 1999, he played many matches and he scored a winning goal against Sagan Tosu on November 5. The club's promotion to J1 League from 2000 decided at this match. However the club was relegated to J2 in a year and he could not play at all in the match for injury in 2001. In 2002, he moved to J2 club Ventforet Kofu and retired end of 2002 season.

Club statistics

References

External links

j-league.or.jp

1974 births
Living people
Kokushikan University alumni
Association football people from Saitama Prefecture
Japanese footballers
J1 League players
J2 League players
Japan Football League (1992–1998) players
Kawasaki Frontale players
Ventforet Kofu players
Association football forwards